Optimum is an American telecommunications brand owned and operated by Altice USA. It is the fourth largest cable provider in the United States and a Fortune 500 company. Optimum offers Internet, television, mobile and home phone serving Arizona, Arkansas, California, Connecticut, Idaho, Kentucky, Louisiana, Mississippi, Missouri, New Jersey, New York, North Carolina, Oklahoma, Pennsylvania, Texas, and West Virginia.

Overview 

Altice One is the company's flagship home entertainment platform, and combines TV, and streaming apps.

Television 

Optimum TV offers cable television service in three tiers:
 Core: 220+ Channels
 Select: 340+ Channels (includes Starz Encore)
 Premier: 420+ Channels (includes HBO, Showtime, and Starz)

Internet 
Optimum offers internet speeds up to 940 megabits per second, with four tiers available:

 "1 Gig", Optimum's flagship speed tier. This speed tier offers 940Mbit/s download speed and is marketed as a "fiber" connection. Fiber connections may also have a 940Mbit/s upload speed. However, fiber is not guaranteed in all locations. Optimum may instead use a coaxial connection for this speed tier, causing service to be 940Mbit/s download and up to only 50 Mbit/s upload.
 500 Mbit/s
 300 Mbit/s

The company also offers a low-cost broadband option, Altice Advantage Internet, for certain eligible customers.

Voice 
Optimum offers landline VOIP telephone service branded as Optimum Voice; the service utilizes a telephone cable modem to provide the service, either alone or combined into a household's main cable modem box.

Mobile 
On September 5, 2019, Altice USA, entered the wireless industry with the launch of Optimum  Mobile, a nationwide mobile virtual network operator service. Optimum Mobile delivers advanced LTE coverage by combining Optimum's own fiber and mobile core infrastructure with two of the best networks in the U.S., giving consumers fast and reliable wireless coverage wherever they are. Optimum customers had the chance to lock in Optimum Mobile's limited time offer of $20 per month per line with a ‘price for life’ commitment. Optimum Mobile is also available to non-Optimum customers.

Business 
Optimum provides small and mid-sized businesses with internet, phone, TV, mobile, Smart WiFi and ad services.

History 
Optimum began as a "30-channel system built in the 1970s" using "copper cable" technology. Modernizations and expansions of their services
included "a fiber optic network" and more channels, with an expanded set of offerings.  As of 2020, the name is still used.

The original Optimum pre-digital technology was limited in the number of channels it could carry. The trademark (styled as OPTIMUM) was "first in use in commerce in August 1994".

Optimum as a Cablevision offering 

Following Optimum being acquired by Cablevision, the brand Optimum TV was used to market a more expensive offering with more channels. By 2004 the name Optimum Voice was used to offer "a new phone service" based on cable-modem technology. Like competing offerings from
AT&T, "it stops working altogether if the power goes out".

The Optimum name was also used to offer Cable-based Internet access; Optimum also pioneered in optionally bundling this with TV access, using "streaming" technology. In what was termed "digital service" Interactive Optimum was not first, but was early in steering the introduction of video-on-demand, alternate camera views for sporting events, and VCR-like rewind and replay. Optimum Select was a related offering, "in which viewers could click on their remote controls to receive more information". Similarly, regarding Optimum's branding and HBO Now, writes the New York Times, "Cablevision’s Internet subscribers can order the service on the company’s website, Optimum.net .., or by calling."

Although references such as "Cablevision's Optimum" do not include the Altice name, both names reflect major market share: one study showed Optimum Voice as the eight-largest phone service provider in the U.S. The name's value was used for about two years when an acquisition held June 2010 through February 2013 was named Optimum West.

Interactive Optimum (iO)     

In late 2001, Interactive Optimum (iO Digital Cable Service) combined "telephone.. Internet.. entertainment" with "60 channels of digital music and 20 channels of .. topics like antique car collecting, vegetarian cooking or wedding planning'. The New York Times described other cable companies in 2002 as having offered "merely a way of improving television reception". By 2004, there were 15 competitors, but the entire subscribing customer base for what others called "Interactive TV" was described as "still rare". Advertising Age reported that "several high-profile ventures that had their plug pulled for troublesome economic or technological reasons".

Even so, by "playing catch-up" iO and the rest of the company's offerings increased customer count from 689,000 (2004) to over 3 million (2016).

Altice USA 
Altice bought the Optimum brand and Cablevision for $17.7 billion in June 2016. Cablevision was combined with Suddenlink Communications to create Altice USA, the fourth largest operator in the United States.

On March 1, 2021, Altice USA announced that it would acquire Morris Broadband in North Carolina for $310 million which was later closed on April 6, 2021. Altice later announced that Morris Broadband would be rebranded into the Optimum name, making it the first time since 2011 when under its predecessor, Cablevision, in which Optimum had systems outside of the New York area.

In April 2022, Altice USA announced that SuddenLink will be rebranded into Optimum. Because of this, Optimum will automatically expand its footprint to eleven additional states, in addition to expanding in North Carolina with its previous acquisition with Morris Broadband. The rebranding was later completed by August 1, 2022.

Narrowcasting 
With the introduction of more than Optimum's original 30 channels, narrowcasting was added to the service's offerings, since it was now economical to provide "programs of much significance to small audiences."

Conflicts 
A New Jersey company that named itself "Optimum Networks Inc." was sued by then-owner Cablevision Systems Corporation (CSC) for violation of the OPTIMUM trademark in 2010.

See also 
 List of multiple-system operators
 List of United States telephone companies

References 

Cable television companies of the United States
Altice USA
VoIP companies of the United States
Telecommunications companies of the United States
Internet service providers of the United States